The Goa Public Service  Commission is a constitutional body of the government of the Indian state of Goa, with responsibility for selection and examination of civil service employees. The Government of Goa is required to consult it on matters relating to the appointment, rules of recruitment, transfer, promotion and disciplinary action of civil servants. It reports directly to the Governor of Goa.

The chairman and other members are appointed by the Governor of Goa. In 2018, Jose Manuel Noronha was the chairman, Ameya Abhayankar was secretary and Seema V. Malkarnekar the deputy-secretary.

History 

After Goa became a Union territory in 1962, the Union Public Service Commission was responsible for civil service recruitment and other service-related matters. When Goa became a State of India in 1987, it became entitled to have its own Public Service Commission. The Goa Public Service Commission was set up on 30 May 1988. The first chairman was J.C. Almeida.

See also
Goa Human Rights Commission
Goa State Information Commission
 List of Public service commissions in India

References 

1988 establishments in Goa
State public service commissions of India
State agencies of Goa
Government of Goa